Dimitri Peyskens (born 26 November 1991) is a Belgian professional road bicycle racer, who currently rides for UCI ProTeam .

Career
Peyskens finished in 3rd place at the 2015 Tour de Liège, and competed in the 2017 Liège–Bastogne–Liège, but did not finish.

Major results

2009
 7th Overall Tour du Valromey
2012
 10th Flèche Ardennaise
2015
 3rd Overall Tour de Liège
 6th Gooikse Pijl
 8th Memorial Van Coningsloo
 10th Rutland–Melton CiCLE Classic
2016
 9th Internationale Wielertrofee Jong Maar Moedig
2017
 2nd Grand Prix de la ville de Nogent-sur-Oise
 3rd Rad am Ring
 7th Volta Limburg Classic
 7th Rund um Köln
 8th Omloop Mandel-Leie-Schelde
 8th Famenne Ardenne Classic
 9th Paris–Chauny
2018
 5th Overall Volta ao Alentejo
 10th Druivenkoers Overijse
2019
 6th Overall Circuit de la Sarthe
 7th Tokyo 2020 Test Event
 8th Boucles de l'Aulne

References

External links

1991 births
Living people
Belgian male cyclists
People from Uccle
Cyclists from Brussels